Nadine Heredia Alarcón de Humala (born 25 May 1976) is a Peruvian politician. As the wife of President of Peru Ollanta Humala, she served as the First Lady of Peru from 2011 to 2016. The President of the Peruvian Nationalist Party (PNP), which formed the Peru Wins electoral alliance in 2011, Heredia is seen as a highly influential figure in Peruvian politics. She has headed the PNP since December 2013.

Early life and education
Both Heredia and her husband had parents who raised them in Quechua-speaking households as children.

Career
She collaborated in the establishment of the Peruvian Nationalist Party, which she currently leads. She was considered a potential candidate in the 2016 Peruvian presidential election, but chose not to run.

As of 2017, the Peruvian justice system is investigating her for serious cases of corruption, usurpation of power and money laundering. The funds were allegedly used to finance President Ollanta Humala's election campaign. Along with her husband Ollanta Humala, she was arrested on 13 July 2017 in connection with this scandal, and was ordered to be held for 18 months.

References

1976 births
Living people
First Ladies of Peru
Peruvian Nationalist Party politicians
Peruvian sociologists
Peruvian women sociologists
Peruvian politicians
Dames Grand Cross of the Order of Isabella the Catholic
University of Lima alumni
People from Lima
Peruvian politicians of Quechua descent
FAO Goodwill ambassadors
Peruvian politicians convicted of crimes